Clubul Sportiv Crișul Chișineu-Criș, commonly known as Crișul Chișineu-Criș, or simply Crișul Chișineu, is a Romanian professional football club based in Chișineu-Criș, Arad County.

The team was founded in 1954 as Strungul Chișineu-Criș and played in the Divizia C for 6 years, between 1985 and 1991. The most important result was a 5th place, achieved at the end of the 1987–88 season. After 1991 Strungul played only in the fourth tier of the Romanian football league system and subsequently changed its name in Crișul Chișineu-Criș. In 2013 Crișul started a collaboration with Europa Alba Iulia and played the second half of the 2012–13 season in the third tier. The alliance did not last and in the summer of 2013 Crișul enrolled again in the Liga IV where from they promoted to Liga III at the end of the 2017–18 season.

History
Crișul Chișineu-Criș was founded in 1954 as Strungul Chișineu-Criș. Between 1985 and 1991 Strungul played in the third tier where it had the following results: 1985–86 – 7th, 1986–87 – 13th, 1987–88 – 5th, 1988–89 – 7th, 1989–90 – 9th, 1990–91 – 15th and 1991–92 – 13th. After 1991 Strungul played only in the Liga IV – Arad County and subsequently changed its name in Crișul Chișineu-Criș. In the second half of the 2012–13 season Crișul started a collaboration with Europa Alba Iulia, but the alliance did not last and in the summer of 2013 chișăuanii enrolled again in the Liga IV. After some seasons in which the team failed to promote, the white and blues won Liga IV, Arad County series, at the end of the 2017–18 season, then the promotion play-off against Petrolul Bustuchin, Gorj County champions and promoting back to Liga III after 27 years of absence.

Ground

Stadionul Crișul
The club plays its home matches on Crișul Stadium from Chișineu-Criș, with a capacity of 2,000. Between 2012 and 2014 the stadium was renovated and upgraded, now having a new covered stand with 500 places on seats.

Honours
Liga III
Runners-up (1): 2020–21
Liga IV – Arad County
Winners (2): 1984–85, 2017–18
Runners-up (3): 2011–12, 2014–15, 2016–17
Cupa României – Arad County
Runners-up (2): 2015–16, 2017–18

Players

First-team squad

Out on loan

Club officials

Board of directors

Current technical staff

League history

References

External links
 Official website
 
 

Football clubs in Arad County
Association football clubs established in 1954
Liga III clubs
Liga IV clubs
1954 establishments in Romania